DeinBus.de (meaning in English YourBus) is a young mobility German provider and offers daily intercity bus service in center Europe. It was launched in 2009. DeinBus.de was sued by Deutsche Bahn and won in court which is deemed responsible for the deregulation of the German mobility market in 2013.

References

External links

Corporate website 

Bus companies of Germany